Karin Gundersen (born 1944) is a Norwegian literary scholar and translator. A professor of French literature at the University of Oslo, she is also a translator of French literary works. She was awarded the Bastian Prize in 1993, for her translation of Stendhal's novel The Charterhouse of Parma into Norwegian. She received the Norwegian Critics Prize for Literature in 2006, for translation of Stendhal's autobiography The Life of Henry Brulard into Norwegian langue. She was awarded the Dobloug Prize in 2006.

She is a fellow of the Norwegian Academy of Science and Letters and the Norwegian Academy for Language and Literature.

References

1944 births
Living people
Norwegian philologists
Norwegian translators
Translators from French
Academic staff of the University of Oslo
Members of the Norwegian Academy of Science and Letters
Members of the Norwegian Academy